Mandorlini is an Italian surname. Notable people with the surname include:

Andrea Mandorlini (born 1960), Italian footballer and manager
Matteo Mandorlini (born 1988), Italian footballer
Davide Mandorlini (born 1983), Italian footballer

Italian-language surnames